Thierry Tulasne (born 12 July 1963) is a former tennis player from France, who won five singles titles during his professional career. He reached his career-high ATP singles ranking of World No. 10 in August 1986. Since his retirement, he has coached players such as Sébastien Grosjean, Paul-Henri Mathieu and Gilles Simon.

Career finals

Singles (5 titles, 4 runner-ups)

References

External links
 
 
 

1963 births
Living people
French male tennis players
Hopman Cup competitors
People from Aix-les-Bains
Wimbledon junior champions
Sportspeople from Savoie
Grand Slam (tennis) champions in boys' singles